Cleveland Forest City was a short-lived major-league franchise that collapsed after 1 month of play with the United States Baseball League in 1912. The Forest City were managed by Jack O'Connor and owned by W.L. Murphy.

1912 Standings 

The Forest City placed 7th in the one-year USBL at 8-13, only better than the New York Knickerbockers.

Notable players
 Joe Delahanty
 Jerry Freeman
 Jack O'Connor

References 

 
United States Baseball League teams
Defunct baseball teams in Ohio
Baseball teams disestablished in 1912
Baseball teams established in 1912